Christopher F. Gaffney (October 3, 1950 – April 17, 2008) was an American singer and songwriter from the Southwest. His career, both as a solo musician and as a member of several bands, was as eclectic as his musical tastes. Although he never achieved widespread fame, Gaffney, who died at the age of 57 from liver cancer, left his mark on country, rock, soul, and other forms of American music. In its obituary, the Los Angeles Times described Gaffney as "a peer of [Dave] Alvin, Los Lobos, X and the Red Hot Chili Peppers in chronicling the life of Southern California."

Career
A self-described "army brat," Christopher F. Gaffney was born in Vienna, Austria, he then moved to Livorno, Italy and New York City as a young child. But Gaffney grew up primarily in southern California and Arizona. In addition to music, Gaffney loved sports, especially boxing, and earned an LA Golden Gloves championship in 1967 and even trained with boxing hall-of-famer Jackie McCoy.

As a child, he learned to play the accordion and listened to norteno, country,
and rock & roll. As a teenager, Gaffney played in various house band and eventually released his first solo album, Road to Indio, in 1986. Produced by friend Wyman Reese, his debut album demonstrated his "genre-bending" tastes by showcasing forays into honky tonk, soul, and Bakersfield country.

His next album was as Chris Gaffney & the Cold Hard Facts. Released in 1990, this album revealed Latino influences and dealt with issues of poverty and working-class life. Two years later, Gaffney released Mi Vida Loca which has been described as a "cross between Merle Haggard and The Blasters." His next solo album, Loser's Paradise, (1995) was produced by Gaffney's friend Dave Alvin 
and featured contributions from Lucinda Williams and Jim Lauderdale.

In 2002, Gaffney formed the band Hacienda Brothers with guitarist and songwriter Dave Gonzalez, founding member of The Paladins. They recorded their third studio album shortly before Gaffney's death in early 2008. He died from liver cancer in Newport, California.

In addition to his solo and band work, Gaffney has also toured as a member of Dave Alvin & the Guilty Men and contributed to albums by Lucinda Williams, The Iguanas, Tom Russell, Christy McWilson, The Lonesome Strangers, and Billy Bacon.

In 2009, a tribute album to Gaffney was released, A Man of Somebody's Dreams: A Tribute to the Songs of Chris Gaffney, which included songs played by fellow Hacienda Brothers as well as others such as Dave Alvin and Los Lobos.

In 2011, Dave Alvin included a song about Gaffney, "Run Conejo Run", in his album Eleven Eleven.

Discography

Solo
1986 – Road to Indio
1989 – Chris Gaffney & the Cold Hard Facts
1992 – Mi Vida Loca
1994 – Man of Somebody's Dreams (Live, Zurich, Switzerland, April 22, 1994)
1995 – Loser's Paradise
2000 – Live & Then Some [2-CD set: CD 1 – live, California, March 27/28, 1999; CD 2- Road to Indio]

With the Hacienda Brothers
2005 – Hacienda Brothers
2006 – What's Wrong with Right
2007 – Live: Music for Ranch & Town (live, Oslo, Norway, October 8, 2005)
2008 – Arizona Motel

Tribute album
2009 – Man of Somebody's Dreams: A Tribute to the Songs of Chris Gaffney

References

External links
Hacienda Brothers' official website
HelpGaff.com
Interview on NPR's Fresh Air

1950 births
2008 deaths
American rockabilly musicians
American blues singers
American country singer-songwriters
American folk singers
American rock guitarists
American male guitarists
American rock singers
Singer-songwriters from California
American alternative country singers
American accordionists
Deaths from liver cancer
Deaths from cancer in California
20th-century American singers
20th-century American guitarists
Guitarists from Arizona
Guitarists from California
20th-century accordionists
Country musicians from California
Country musicians from Arizona
20th-century American male musicians
American male singer-songwriters
Singer-songwriters from Arizona